Seven Day Weekend may refer to:

 Seven Day Weekend (album), a 1992 album by the New York Dolls
 7 Day Weekend (album), a 1985 album by The Comsat Angels
 "7 Day Weekend" (song), a 1992 song by Grace Jones
 "Seven Day Weekend", a song by Gary U.S. Bonds
 "Seven-Day Weekend", a song by Elvis Costello and the Attractions for the movie Club Paradise
 7 Day Weekend (band), a pop punk band from Warrington England.
 "Seven Day Weekend", a 2012 song by JTX.
 The Seven-Day Weekend: Changing the Way Work Works, a 2003 book by Ricardo Semler